The A Line (formerly, from 1990 to 2019, and colloquially known as Blue Line) is a  light rail line running north–south between Los Angeles and Long Beach, California, passing through Downtown Los Angeles, South Los Angeles, Watts, Willowbrook, Compton, Rancho Dominguez, and Long Beach in Los Angeles County. It is one of seven lines in the Metro Rail system. Opened in 1990, it is the system's oldest and third-busiest line with an estimated 22.38 million boardings per year . It is operated by the Los Angeles County Metropolitan Transportation Authority.

The A Line passes near the cities of Vernon, Huntington Park, South Gate, Lynwood, and Carson. The famous Watts Towers art installation is visible from the train tracks near 103rd Street station. The under-construction Regional Connector will directly link this line to Union Station and into the San Gabriel Valley along the current route of the L Line, resulting in a longer A Line and the elimination of the L Line.

Service description

Route description 
The A Line runs  between Downtown Los Angeles and Downtown Long Beach and has 22 stations.

The line's northern terminus is the underground  station. After rising to street level, trains run south along Flower Street, sharing tracks with the E Line. Passengers can connect to the bus rapid transit J Line at 7th Street/Metro Center, Pico, and Grand stations. The A and E Lines diverge at Flower Street and Washington Boulevard just south of downtown Los Angeles. Here the A Line turns east on Washington Boulevard before turning south into the former Pacific Electric right-of-way at Long Beach Avenue. This historic rail corridor has four tracks, two for Metro Rail trains and two for freight trains. Along the corridor, there are some elevated sections to either eliminate street crossings in more densely populated areas or pass over diverging freight train tracks. Passengers can connect with the C Line at the Willowbrook station. Just south of Willow station, A Line trains exit the rail corridor and begin street running in the median of Long Beach Boulevard into the city of Long Beach, where trains travel through the Long Beach Transit Mall while making a loop using 1st Street, Pacific Avenue, and 8th Street.

Hours and frequency

Speed 
Trips taking an hour or more, however, are not unusual.

Station listing 
The following is the complete list of stations, from north to south.

Ridership

History 

Much of the current A Line follows the route of the Pacific Electric Railway's Long Beach interurban line, which ended service in 1961. The old route gave the new light rail trains a private right-of-way between Washington and  stations allowing them to reach higher speeds between stops.

The street running section to  opened in September 1990, followed by the tunnel into  in February 1991.

The route was a success, and from 1999 to 2001, the Blue Line underwent an US$11 million project to lengthen 19 of its platforms so that they could accommodate three-car trains. Plans were also made to extend the Blue Line north to Pasadena, but the connection across downtown was deferred, and the northern portion opened as the Gold Line in 2003. That original plan for the Blue Line became reality when the Regional Connector was announced in 2009. Ground was broken for the Regional Connector across downtown in 2014 and is expected to be completed in 2022.

The Blue Line was renovated in 2019, with the southern half of the line being closed for the first five months and the northern half closing for the following five months (10 months total). Metro provided bus shuttle service to compensate for the lack of rail service. Metro officially reopened the line on November 2, 2019, rebranding it as the A Line.

Future developments

Regional Connector Transit Project 

Metro is currently testing the Regional Connector, a light rail subway tunnel in Downtown Los Angeles that will connect the A and E Lines to the L Line and allow a seamless "one-seat ride" on the A Line to Union Station. When this project is completed, service will be simplified into the following configuration:

 A Line
 The northeastern segment of the L Line (north of Little Tokyo/Arts District) will serve as an extension to the current A Line
 The Foothill Extension will also be absorbed into the A Line, extending it further to Pomona–North station upon completion
 E Line
 The southern portion of the current L Line to East L.A. will be combined with the current E Line, which will keep the E Line name but use the gold color on maps

The groundbreaking for constructing the Regional Connector took place on September 30, 2014, and it is expected to be in public service in early 2023.

Current issues

Capacity limits 

The line often operates at capacity, and various options to increase capacity have been considered, such as four-car or more frequent trains. Both have problems: it would be difficult or impossible to lengthen some of the station platforms, and the number of trains already causes delays for other vehicles at level crossings. Thus it may not be possible to increase A Line ridership without a costly grade-separation project, either by elevation, by an entrenchment method similar to that used by the nearby Alameda Corridor freight rail "expressway," or by building another parallel transit corridor to relieve capacity strains from the A Line. When the Regional Connector project linking A and E Line tracks with the L Line tracks in Little Tokyo is completed, this may result in even more capacity problems, with ridership expected to grow even more once the connector is open for service.

Safety at level crossings 

Over 120 motorists and pedestrians have been killed at A Line level crossings since 1990. There have been more than 800 collisions, making the line easily the country's deadliest and most collision-prone rail line.

In 1998, the MTA commissioned Booz Allen Hamilton, Inc. to evaluate the cause of Blue Line collisions and recommend affordable solutions. The study reported the high ridership (over 70,000 per day) was a contributor:

The collision rate has declined somewhat following the installation of four-quadrant gates at some crossings where the A Line shares the right-of-way with freight rail between Willowbrook station and Artesia station. The gates prevent drivers from going around lowered gates. In addition, cameras along some problem intersections issue traffic tickets when drivers go around gates.

Operations 
On Metro Rail Operations' internal timetables, the A Line is called line 801.

Maintenance facilities 
The A Line is operated out of the Division 11 Yard (208th Street Yard) located at 4350 East 208th Street. This yard stores the fleet used on the A Line. It is also where heavy maintenance is done on the fleet. Trains get to this yard via a wye junction on the southbound tracks. Northbound trains can enter and exit the yard via the cross tracks on the north and south side of the junction.

Rolling stock 

The A Line uses 2 different types of rolling stock from Siemens and Kinki Sharyo.

When the Blue Line first opened in 1990, the line had 54 Nippon Sharyo P865 light rail vehicles, numbered 100–153. These cars wore a unique livery consisting of several blue stripes and a single red stripe, reflecting the Blue Line's color designation and its Pacific Electric Red Car heritage.

In 2000, Metro transferred all 15 Nippon Sharyo P2020 (Numbered 154-168) light rail vehicles from the Green Line to the Blue Line fleet. These light rail vehicles were nearly identical to the older P865 model but were about five years newer and originally had an automated control panel for automatic train operation in each cab.

In 2012, Metro transferred some Siemens P2000 light rail vehicles from the Gold Line to the Blue Line fleet.

In 2017, the Blue Line received 78 Kinki Sharyo P3010 light rail vehicles, the first new fleet since it opened in 1990. As the P3010 fleet was introduced, Metro gradually retired all of the remaining P865 light rail vehicles, the original vehicles used on the line. In 2021, the final deliveries of the P3010s resulted in the 15 P2020 railcars retiring as Metro has no more room for the aging vehicles.

A Line vehicles are maintained and stored at the Division 11 yard in Long Beach between Del Amo and Wardlow stations. This facility can house and maintain 86 light rail cars.

By the time of the Regional Connector opening in 2022, it is expected that Division 21 in Elysian Park and Division 24 in Monrovia will be acquired for A Line service as the A and L lines will merge into one route.

References

External links 

 Los Angeles County Metropolitan Transportation Authority
 Blue Line homepage
 Blue Line schedule
 Blue Line connections overview
 A History of the Blue Line: A Light Rail Success Story by the Transit Coalition
 Killing Time on the Ghetto Blue from the LA Weekly
 Delivery of The First Metro Blue Line Vehicle

 
Light rail in California
Public transportation in Los Angeles
Public transportation in Los Angeles County, California
Transportation in Long Beach, California
South Los Angeles
Railway lines opened in 1990
1990 establishments in California